A space traveler is a person who performs human spaceflight.

Space traveler(s) may also refer to:

Space Travelers: The Animation - 2000 Japanese science fiction and action animated film
Space Travelers (2000 film), 2000 Japanese action comedy film
Space Travelers, 1991 re-release name of Marooned, 1969 American film starring Gregory Peck

See also
 Space travel (disambiguation)